Pselaphelia is a genus of moths in the family Saturniidae first described by Per Olof Christopher Aurivillius in 1904.

Species
Pselaphelia antelata Darge, 2003
Pselaphelia arenivaga Darge, 2003
Pselaphelia aurata Bouyer, 1992
Pselaphelia dentifera (Maassen & Weyding, 1885)
Pselaphelia flavivitta (Walker, 1862)
Pselaphelia gemmifera (Butler, 1878)
Pselaphelia hurumai Darge, 2003
Pselaphelia laclosi Darge, 2002
Pselaphelia mariaetheresae Darge, 2002
Pselaphelia neglecta Darge, 2003
Pselaphelia noellae Bouyer, 2008
Pselaphelia oremansi Darge, 2008
Pselaphelia vandenberghei Bouyer, 1992
Pselaphelia vingerhoedti Bouyer, 2008

References

Saturniinae